The Cathedral of Saint Titus also known as Hagios Titos, is an Orthodox church in the city of Heraklion, Crete, dedicated to Saint Titus. The current church was built in 1869 as the Yeni Cami ("New Mosque") and in 1925 it was converted to Christian worship. The church was declared a cathedral of the archdiocese of Crete in 2013. The church is an eclectic style square temple with a dome. The exterior of the temple is dominated by vertical elements, while at the top there is a stone-carved apse.

History 
After the reconquest of Crete by the Byzantines in 961, the episcopal seat of Crete was moved from Gortyn to Chandax (later Candia, modern Heraklion), which became the capital of the island. A new metropolitan church was built in Chandax, dedicated to the apostle Titus, the first bishop of Crete. That church was a single-aisled building. Various relics were brought to the church, among which the Holy Head of Titus and the icon of Virgin Mary Mesopanditissa. In 1210, Crete came under the control of the Venetians and a Roman Catholic archbishop was installed in the church. It underwent some modifications, such as the opening of a circular skylight and the construction of a bell tower. This first building was destroyed before the middle of the 15th century.

The church was then rebuilt in the style of a three-aisled basilica and was inaugurated by the archbishop of Crete, Fantino Dandolo, on January 3, 1446. It was slightly damaged by the earthquake of 1508, and was destroyed by a fire on April 3, 1544, although the relics of the church were saved. The church was rebuilt in the same style in 1557. After the fall of Candia to the Ottoman Turks in 1669, the relics were moved to Venice and the church was converted into a Muslim mosque, dedicated to Köprülüzade Fazıl Ahmed Pasha, the conqueror of Crete and Candia. The mosque was also known as the Vizier Mosque. That building was destroyed by the earthquake of 1856.

The current building began to be constructed in 1869 according to a plan by Athanasios Moussis, who also designed, among others, the metropolitan church of Saint Menas. This new mosque building became known as the Yeni Mosque, or New Mosque, although it retained its old name. After the integration of Crete into Greece and the exchange of Balkan Muslim populations for Anatolian Christian ones, the building was repaired by the Church of Crete and dedicated to Orthodox Christian worship on May 3, 1925. The minaret of the mosque was demolished. On May 15, 1966, the head of Saint Titus was returned to the church by the city of Venice.

From 1974 to 1988, work was carried out to fix and restore the church.

In 2013, the church of Saint Titus was made cathedral of the Archdiocese of Crete by Archbishop .

See also 
 Church of Crete
 Hagia Sophia, Thessaloniki

References

External links 
 

Ottoman mosques in Greece
Former mosques in Greece
Greek Orthodox cathedrals in Greece
Eastern Orthodoxy in Crete
Buildings and structures in Heraklion
Churches in Crete
Tourist attractions in Crete
Church buildings with domes
Churches completed in 1869
19th-century churches in Greece
Churches converted from mosques
19th-century mosques
Mosques converted from churches in Ottoman Greece